Harmon White Caldwell (January 29, 1899 – April 15, 1977) was President of the University of Georgia (UGA) in Athens from 1935 until 1948 and Chancellor of the University System of Georgia from 1948 to 1964.

Caldwell was born in the Carmel Community of Meriwether County, Georgia, in 1899. He earned an A.B. from UGA in 1919 after only two years and was a member of the Chi Phi Fraternity and the Phi Kappa Literary Society. Upon graduation, he taught public school in both Sasser, Georgia and Taylorsville, Georgia. In 1921, Caldwell entered the Harvard Law School and graduated with the degree Bachelor of Law (LL.B.) in 1924. That same year he became a part-time assistant professor of law at Emory University in Atlanta, Georgia, in addition to practicing law at the firm of King, Caldwell and Partridge. Five years later, Caldwell assumed a professorship at the UGA School of Law. He returned to the law practice and part-time duties at Emory in 1932; however, he returned to UGA as the dean of the law school in 1933.

Caldwell's accomplishments as president include:
 Reorganization of the Graduate School in 1937
 Stewarding the purchase of the DeRenne Library of Georgianna, which formed the nucleus of the present day Department of Special Collections at University Libraries
 Creation of the University of Georgia Press
 The Navy preflight school
 A rise in attendance from 2,468 in the fall of 1945 to 6,643 in the fall of 1946

The following buildings were opened during Caldwell's presidential tenure:
 Mary Lyndon Hall (1936)
 Four Towers (1937)
 Hoke Smith Building (1937)
 Clark Howell Hall (1937)
 Forestry Resources Building (1938)
 Baldwin Hall (1938)
 LeConte Hall (1938)
 Park Hall (1938)
 Rutherford Hall (1939)
 Dairy Science Building (1939)
 Snelling Hall (1940)
 McPhaul Child and Family Development Center (1940)
 Payne Hall (1940)
 Founders' Memorial Garden (1941)
 Fine Arts Building (1941)
 Alumni House (1943)
 Stegeman Hall (1943).

Caldwell also served as a trustee of the Berry Schools and Callaway Gardens in Georgia.

Desegregation

In 1961, during Caldwell's tenure the University of Georgia was forcibly desegregated. While Black applicants were told there was no campus accommodation available for them, an internal communication from Caldwell indicated that the university was "relying on this to bar the admission of a Negro girl from Atlanta."

Death

In 1977, Caldwell died in Atlanta, Georgia. Caldwell Hall, home to the University of Georgia's School of Environment and Design, is named in his honor, as well as the Harmon W. Caldwell Professorship in Constitutional Law in the UGA Law School.

References

History of the University of Georgia by Thomas Walter Reed, Thomas Walter Reed,  Imprint:  Athens, Georgia : University of Georgia, ca. 1949
From Ahmedunggar to Lavonia Presidents at the University of Georgia 1785-1997, University of Georgia Libraries, Hargrett Rare Book and Manuscript Library 
Georgia Historical Society Carmel Historic District Marker

External links
UGA Law School Portrait

1899 births
1977 deaths
Presidents of the University of Georgia
Harvard Law School alumni
University of Georgia alumni
People from Meriwether County, Georgia
20th-century American academics